Gangrene  is the third album by Mirrorthrone. The song, "So Frail", is featured in the video game, Brütal Legend.

Track listing
 Dismay - 11:34
 No One By My Side - 10:26
 The Fecal Rebellion - 15:03
 Ganglion - 8:52
 Une Existence dont plus Personne ne Jouit - 12:06  
 So Frail - 6:40

Credits
Vladimir Cochet - Vocals, Guitars, Bass, Synthesizer & drum programming.

References

2008 albums
Mirrorthrone albums